Kastu is a district in the Tampereentie ward of the city of Turku, in Finland. It is located to the north of the city centre, and consists mostly of low-density residential area.

The current population of Kastu is 2,002, and it is decreasing at an annual rate of 1.35%. 10.14% of the district's population are under 15 years old, while 28.12% are over 65. The district's linguistic makeup is 95.60% Finnish, 2.15% Swedish, and 2.25% other.

See also
 Districts of Turku
 Districts of Turku by population

Districts of Turku